Uddaka Rāmaputta (Pāli) was a sage and teacher of meditation identified by the Buddhist tradition as one of the teachers of Gautama Buddha. 'Rāmaputta' means 'son of Rāma', who may have been his father or spiritual teacher. Uddaka Rāmaputta taught refined states of meditation known as the dhyanic formless attainments (arūpa samāpatti).

Relationship with Gautama Buddha 
After his departure from his father's court, Gautama Buddha first went to Āḷāra Kālāma and after following his method was recognized as having equalled his master. Gautama was eager to learn more, and chose to depart to search for another teacher rather than accept a position as co-leader of Āḷāra Kālāma's community. He found Uddaka Rāmaputta and accepted him as teacher.

While Āḷāra Kālāma accepted the Buddha as an equal and asked him to lead his community alongside him, Uddaka Rāmaputta acknowledged the Buddha as his superior and equal to his predecessor, Uddaka Rāma, who had actually attained the "sphere of neither perception nor non-perception", which Rāmaputta had not reached. Uddaka Rāmaputta asked the Buddha to take sole leadership of his students and community, but the Buddha preferred to travel on.

Following his awakening, the Buddha first thought of Uddaka Rāmaputta as someone who would be able to understand and realize his dharma, but later learned that Uddaka Rāmaputta had already died by that time. Despite this confidence, in other texts the Buddha disparaged Uddaka Rāmaputta as someone who claimed attainments and understanding without having achieved them for himself.

Sources and historicity 
Several suttas in the Majjhima Nikaya contain stories about the Bodhisattva's visits to the two teachers, with the Ariyapariyesana Sutta (MN 26) identified as the likely source of subsequent Pali versions. Parallel stories from several different early Buddhist schools are preserved in Sanskrit and Chinese, including within the Mahāvastu. Other references to Uddaka Rāmaputta are scattered through the four Nikayas, with additional mentions in the Vinaya and the commentaries to the Dhammapada.

While Andre Bareau argued that both Uddaka Rāmaputta and Āḷāra Kālāma were fictional creations, later scholars have accepted the possibility that they may have been real historical figures. The surviving sources all agree in placing Uddaka Rāmaputta in Rajagriha during the Buddha's lifetime, despite being drawn from different schools' translations. Hsuan Tsang also recorded legends in his era that associated Uddaka Rāmaputta with the vicinity of Rajagriha. Most traditions have also preserved the distinction between Uddaka Rāmaputta and his father or teacher Uddaka Rāma, but in a few recensions the two figures have been combined.

References

Gautama Buddha